The Hemet Maze Stone is a prehistoric petroglyph. It is just outside Hemet in Reinhardt Canyon, within the Lakeview Mountains, in Riverside County, California. It is California Historical Landmark No.557. The government installed two perimeter chain link fences around the petroglyph landmark for protection.

The surrounding land has been set aside for the protection of native plants and animals (with a warning that the “natural features may be hazardous”). The property is located at the end of California Avenue to the north of Highway 74 and several miles east of Interstate 215, near Hemet. The road has been blocked off to prevent people from driving too close to the Maze Stone. The Riverside County Parks Open Space Office is available at 909-245-1212.

Features

The "maze" consists of two rectangular boxes—one large and containing the other; centered. If one traces the patterns with different colored markers, one would find that between the boxes are two contiguous geometric patterns that resemble a maze. One "maze" is contained by the other on the left hand side.

The swastika that appears in the lower left hand corner is not part of the original work. A 1930s-era photo featured in the Hemet Centennial calendar shows the stone without this. (Featured photo of July 2010; available from the Hemet Museum).

The stone and its surrounding land were designated as a California state landmark in 1956. Sometime later a vandal added a counter-clockwise swastika to one corner of the carving. This is not the same swastika that the Nazis in Germany appropriated after WWI; the Nazis used the clockwise version of the swastika.
Swastikas were used in Oriental and Native American art long before the Nazis used it as a symbol. The stone is now protected by a pair of chain-link fences.

The maze petroglyph, depending upon interpretation, could show four walled structures or areas, consisting of two simple objects and two “maze-like” complex objects. There is an inner and outer object for each type of simple or complex object.

To reference the diagram called “Conceptual Approximation of the Maze Stone near Hemet, California,” the "simple" objects are denoted by the square/rectangular black (outer) and gray/beige (inner) lines. The gray/beige area is filled in and appears as a rectangular object.  What the computer considers a gray color, other people say is the color beige. The "complex" objects are blue (outer) and purple (inner). The purplish complex object appears to be completely surrounded by the blueish complex object. The inner objects are completely surrounded in the space created by the outer objects. The blueish object seems to surround the simple gray object in the center, but is unable to completely do so. The gray/beige object is either directly attached and is completely surrounded by the space associated with the outer black boundary wall that surrounds the whole “maze.”

Taking away or adding the blue and purple areas makes no difference to the relationship between the inner gray/beige object and the outer black boundary line, as the space between them is still connected. The space inside the black line was left white/blank. The diagram was created from multiple pictures, and visual guesswork was used with a computer graphics program to draw straight, colorized lines without measurements.

The petroglyph appears to be a square, although the attempt to redo the diagram by computer produced better results when slightly elongated as a rectangle. Also the original is on the slightly curved surface of a stone. Whether the maze can be recreated in a square while attempting to keep all the lines "uniformly separated" on a flat surface arose as an issue for the creator of the conceptual approximation diagram. Since there are ten lines to be crossed on the top, bottom, left and right of the original petroglyph, the idealized version of the “maze” could fit into a square.

The original design constraints and reasoning behind the prehistoric design remain unclear. At any given spot in the blueish space, there are up to three possible directions to follow, not the four directions possible when 90-degree line segments join. The outside edge of the outer complex object shows the outline of the inner complex object three times. There are three “dead ends” (in maze terminology) to the blueish-object's area. If one looks at the spot where two of the blueish ends meet before reaching the inner complex object on the left side, one would have to transverse six straight segments to reach that point – from either end point.

The analysis discussion can be changed by switching the "walls" to pathways and the pathways to be impassable areas, but the “maze” has design features that have nothing to do with a conventional “maze”. That is, where the objective is to go from a starting point to an ending point through a confusing set of passageways. The Maze Stone is not what European Americans might consider to be a regular maze. Without knowing the original intent of the creator, it is difficult to know if the maze represents an engineering drawing, a symbol, an artistic concept, or something else.

This petroglyph is classified as California Engraved, within the California Tradition of rock art.

References

 Coordinates: 

Petroglyphs in California
California Historical Landmarks
Landmarks of Riverside County, California
Protected areas of Riverside County, California
History of Riverside County, California